Frankie J. Sanders (born January 23, 1957) is an American former professional basketball player. After a standout collegiate career at Southern University, in which Sanders averaged 26 points and 10 rebounds per game and scored over 2,000 points in his three-year career, he was selected in the 1978 NBA draft by the San Antonio Spurs as the 20th overall pick. 

Sanders' NBA career was shortened by self-admitted irresponsible behavior, such as drug use, drinking, and partying too much. He played for three different teams in two seasons despite being a first round draft selection. Over the course of his professional career, he played in the Continental Basketball Association (CBA), United States Basketball League (USBL), and overseas in France, Spain, and Venezuela. Sanders won the CBA championship in 1983–84 while playing for the Albany Patroons.

References

1957 births
Living people
Albany Patroons players
Albuquerque Silvers players
American expatriate basketball people in France
American expatriate basketball people in Spain
American expatriate basketball people in Venezuela
American men's basketball players
Basketball players from Dayton, Ohio
Boston Celtics players
Kansas City Kings players
San Antonio Spurs draft picks
San Antonio Spurs players
Small forwards
Southern Jaguars basketball players